Timothy Robert Reddish  (born 12 April 1957) is an English sports administrator and former Paralympic swimmer who was the Chairman of the British Paralympic Association. Governing Board member International Paralympic Committee. He won a total of five medals at three Paralympic Games.

Personal history
Reddish was born in Nottingham in 1957. He became a leisure centre manager for Nottingham City Council and a sports development officer. In 1988, at the age of 31 he was diagnosed with retinitis pigmentosa, a hereditary degenerative condition affecting his sight. By 1996 he lost his vision completely, but in 2013 he underwent surgery in which an artificial retina was inserted into his eye which has enabled him to regain partial sight.

Swimming career
Reddish had been a keen swimmer as a youth, and when his sight deteriorated he decided to become classified as a disability swimmer. Initially classed as a B2 athlete with reduced vision, he entered his first international tournament, the European Championships in Switzerland, in 1989. There he won 11 medals, including two gold. Reddish first represented Great Britain at a Summer Paralympics at Barcelona in 1992. In Spain Reddish won two medals, a silver in the 100m butterfly B1-B2 and a bronze in the 100m freestyle. Four years later he competed at the 1996 Summer Paralympics in Atlanta. Competing in five events, and now swimming as a B1 athlete (completely blind), he matched his achievements from Barcelona with another silver and bronze, this time in the 200m medley and the 100m freestyle. His final Paralympics as a competitor were the 2000 Games in Sydney. There he collected his fifth and final medal, winning silver in the men's 4 × 100 m Medley for S11-13 category swimmers.

As sports administrator
In 1998 Reddish was appointed the National coordinator of British Swimming and in 2003 he became National Performance Director for the Disability Swim Team. Following the success of the British team at Beijing he left his post as Performance Director to become Chairman of the British Paralympic Association. He was also a board member of London Organising Committee of the Olympic and Paralympic Games (LOCOG). Tim is currently a Governing Board Member of the International Paralympic Committee (IPC).

Awards
In 2001 Reddish was appointed a MBE for his services to swimming. In 2005 he was awarded Freeman of the City of Nottingham. He was appointed Officer of the Order of the British Empire (OBE) in the 2008 New Year Honours and Commander of the Order of the British Empire (CBE) in the 2017 New Year Honours for services to sport. appointed at Deputy Lieutenant of Nottinghamshire (DL) 2019.

References

External links 
 Tim Reddish at the International Paralympic Committee

British male freestyle swimmers
1957 births
Paralympic swimmers of Great Britain
Swimmers at the 1992 Summer Paralympics
Swimmers at the 1996 Summer Paralympics
Swimmers at the 2000 Summer Paralympics
Paralympic gold medalists for Great Britain
Paralympic silver medalists for Great Britain
Paralympic bronze medalists for Great Britain
English blind people
World record holders in paralympic swimming
Commanders of the Order of the British Empire
Living people
Medalists at the 1992 Summer Paralympics
Medalists at the 1996 Summer Paralympics
Medalists at the 2000 Summer Paralympics
British sports executives and administrators
Sportspeople from Nottingham
International Paralympic Committee members
Paralympic medalists in swimming
British male butterfly swimmers
S11-classified Paralympic swimmers